Madonna and Child with Saints by the Master of San Lucchese (14th century, around 1345) is an Italian painting, with tempera and gold lead on panel as its medium. It is currently in San Francisco in the Legion of Honor. There are bibles and auras around the saints, Madonna, and baby. Figures are holding holy sceptres or sepulchers. Some of the men seems to have crowns. The women at the end of each column are the highest elevated person.

The artist is relatively unknown, and mostly known through pieces recovered by historians. This piece was in Florence, in San Lucchese, in a church in Poggibonsi on the altar.

The main subject is Madonna who stands at the middle of the piece.  At her left and right stand 3 figures on each side, 6 in total.  There are two females and 4 males.  She and the child both have auras around their heads, as well as the individuals standing beside her.  She is looking at the child and the child back into her eyes, but all the other people are looking at the center of the piece.  Some of the other people may be Saint Peter, Mary Magdalen, John the Baptist, Anthony Abbot, Paul, and Saint Augustine, Lawrence, Paul, and maybe Catherine of Alexandria?

There is a one panel image. In the middle Madonna is the central and biggest figure in the painting, holding a small child.  All of the other saints and angels are small compared to size.  It is a 2d painting, and the picture is crowded with people, except Madonna has space.  There is a red behind the background and the angels have auras.  The figures are small relative to the amount of space given for the piece. It is made on gold panels with engravings and paint stained on it.

References

1340s paintings
Paintings of the Madonna and Child
Paintings in the collection of the Fine Arts Museums of San Francisco